Zwei himmlische Töchter (English: Two Heavenly Daughters) is a German television series.

See also
List of German television series

External links
 

German comedy television series
Aviation television series
1978 German television series debuts
1978 German television series endings
German-language television shows
Das Erste original programming